Albannach is the debut album of Scottish band Albannach. It was released in 2006.

Track listing

Credits

 Jamesie Johnston – Bass Drum, Vocals, Bodhrán
 Donnie MacNeill – Bagpipes, Drums, Percussion
 Jacquie Holland – Drums, Percussion, Vocals
 Kyle Gray – Lead Drums
 Aya Thorne – Bodhrán
 Davey 'Ramone' Morrison – Bodhrán, Vocals, Whistles
 Andy Malkin – Mixing, Programming
 Mick MacNeil – Recording

External links
 Albannach Band Website www.albannachmusic.com
 Sample Tracks on ShoutCAST

2006 debut albums
Albannach (band) albums